Mike Sterner is a former American football coach.  He was the head football coach at Southwest Minnesota State University in Marshall, Minnesota, serving for four seasons, from 1973 to 1976, and compiling a record of 9–27.

References

Year of birth missing (living people)
Living people
Southwest Minnesota State Mustangs football coaches